Joen is a given name. Notable people with the name include:

Joen Bille (born 1944), Danish actor
Joen Danielsen (1843–1926), Faroese poet and songwriter
Joen Jacobsen (1714–1768), Norwegian master builder

See also
Joe (given name)
Joel (given name)